In mathematics, a complex Hadamard matrix H of size N with all its columns (rows) mutually orthogonal,  belongs  to the Butson-type H(q, N) if all its elements are powers of q-th root of unity,

Existence 

it is conjectured they exist for all such cases 
For , the corresponding conjecture is existence for all multiples of 4.
In general, the problem of finding all sets
 such that the Butson - type matrices
 exist, remains open.

Examples 
 contains real Hadamard matrices of size N,
 contains Hadamard matrices composed of   - such matrices were called by Turyn, complex Hadamard matrices.
 in the limit  one can approximate all complex Hadamard matrices.
Fourier matrices 
belong to the Butson-type,

 

 while

 

 

 

 ,  where

References

 A. T. Butson, Generalized Hadamard matrices, Proc. Am. Math. Soc. 13, 894-898 (1962).
 A. T. Butson, Relations among generalized Hadamard matrices, relative difference sets, and maximal length linear recurring sequences, Can. J. Math. 15, 42-48 (1963).
 R. J. Turyn, Complex Hadamard matrices, pp. 435–437 in Combinatorial Structures and their Applications, Gordon and Breach, London (1970).

External links
Complex Hadamard Matrices of Butson type - a catalogue, by Wojciech Bruzda, Wojciech Tadej and Karol Życzkowski, retrieved October 24, 2006

Matrices